Setters is a 2019 Indian Hindi-language crime thriller film directed by Ashwini Chaudhary and produced by Vikash Mani. Based on the examination of cheating rackets present in India, the film stars Aftab Shivdasani, Shreyas Talpade, Sonnalli Seygall, Vijay Raaz, Ishita Dutta, Pavan Malhotra, Jameel Khan and Pankaj Jha. The film is about an eponymous racket which arranges brilliant student in place of weak student to appear in examination for money.

Principal photography began on 10 October 2018 and was held at various locations in New Delhi, Varanasi, Jaipur and Mumbai. Set in Banaras, Jaipur, Mumbai and Delhi, the film was released on 3 May 2019.

Plot 
Apurva Chaudhary is the head of an examination cheating racket "Setters", which specializes in conning the examination, which includes banking, medical and engineering entrance exams. They leak the papers using their extensive network, also providing proxy candidates and latest technology based cheating. The team makes profit worth crores from students who have paid money. Apurva is controlled by Bhaiyyaji, who manages the trade from Varanasi.

To find a solution, a special police taskforce headed by Inspector Aditya Singh is set up. Aditya is one of Apurva's former best friends, and they are now on opposite sides of the law. The team tries everything but Apurva and gang come up with new ideas everytime. After he successfully cons the banking examination for one in Mumbai, Bhaiyyaji gives him the next task of engineering examination. But the cops are close and they arrest three members of Apurva's gang. They do not reveal anything under torture.

Apurva asks Bhaiyyaji for help, but he now wants to join a party and, in line with his political aspirations, he doesn't help them. Apurva and Bhaiyyaji hence clash and they set up individual operations now. Aditya is almost on the verge of catching Apurva red-handed, but his plan is again foiled as Apurva and gang, along with Bhaiyyaji's daughter Prerana, who loves Apurva, are shown going to the other end of the Indo-Nepal border masquerading as police officers.

Cast 
Aftab Shivdasani as Inspector Aditya Singh
Shreyas Talpade as Apurva Chaudhary 
Sonnalli Seygall as Isha
Vijay Raaz as Nizam
Pavan Malhotra as Bhaiyyaji
Zeishan Quadri as Nihal
Sharat Saxena as Salim Bhai
Mahesh Manjrekar as Choudhry Ji
Ishita Dutta as Prerana, Bhaiya Ji's daughter
Jameel Khan as Ansari
Neeraj Sood as Bhanu
Pankaj Jha as Kesariya
Venus Singh as Aarushi 
Manu Rishi as Balam 
Anil Mange as Dibakar
Diksha Singh as Divya Singh, Aditya's wife
Umesh Bhatia as Bank Manager

Soundtrack 

The film's soundtrack is composed by Salim–Sulaiman and Enbee while the lyrics are written by Dr. Sagar, Raftaar and Enbee.

Release 
The film was released on 3 May 2019.

Reception

Box office 
Setters has earned 58 lakh in India.

See also
 Vyapam scam

References

External links
 
 

2019 films
Indian crime thriller films
2010s Hindi-language films
Indian courtroom films
2019 crime thriller films
Films about academic scandals
Films about examinations and testing
Films about the education system in India
Films about corruption in India